The 1920 Paris–Tours was the 15th edition of the Paris–Tours cycle race and was held on 2 May 1920. The race started in Paris and finished in Tours. The race was won by Eugène Christophe.

General classification

References

1920 in French sport
1920
May 1920 sports events